Venecia is a town and municipality in Antioquia Department, Colombia.

History
The settlement, from which later became the town, was founded on the 13 of January 1898. Venecia Municipality was isolated in a separate administrative unit in 1909.

References

Municipalities of Antioquia Department